Fact was an American quarterly magazine that commented on controversial topics. It was in circulation between January 1964 and August 1967.

History
The publisher of Fact was Trident Press based in New York City. The magazine was edited by Ralph Ginzburg and Warren Boroson and designed by Herb Lubalin.

Fact was notable for having been sued by Barry Goldwater over a 1964 issue entitled "The Unconscious of a Conservative: A special Issue on the Mind of Barry Goldwater". In Goldwater v. Ginzburg, a federal jury awarded Goldwater $1 in compensatory damages and $75,000 in punitive damages, to punish Ginzburg and the magazine for being reckless. The American Psychiatric Association then issued the Goldwater rule reaffirming medical privacy and forbidding commenting on a patient whom the individual psychiatrist has not personally examined. 

The United States Court of Appeals for the Second Circuit affirmed the award and the Supreme Courts denied a petition for certiorari (review); Justice Black and Justice Douglas joined a dissenting opinion, rather unusual at the time (1970) on orders denying "cert."

References

Further reading
 
 Goldwater v. Ginzburg, 414 F.2d 324, 337 (2d Cir.1969), cert. denied, 396 US 1049, 90 S.Ct. 701, 24 L.Ed.2d 695.
 

Defunct political magazines published in the United States
Magazines established in 1964
Magazines disestablished in 1967
Magazines published in New York City
Quarterly magazines published in the United States